Le Blanc is a commune in the Indre department of France.

Le Blanc (French, 'the White'), LeBlanc or Leblanc may also refer to:

Places
Arrondissement of Le Blanc, France
Le Blanc-Mesnil, Paris, France
LeBlanc, Louisiana, in Iberville Parish, Louisiana, U.S.
Le Blanc, Louisiana, in Allen Parish, Louisiana, U.S.

Other uses
 Leblanc (automobile manufacturer), a Swiss car maker
 Leblanc (musical instrument manufacturer), an American company
 Le Blanc (surname), including list of people with surname le Blanc, LeBlanc or Leblanc
 CCGS A. LeBlanc, a Canadian Coast Guard ship

See also

La Blanche (disambiguation) 
 Leblanc process, for the production of soda ash
 Leblanc syndicate, characters of Final Fantasy X and X-2 video game